Prince of Gui, was a first-rank princely peerage used during Ming dynasty, this peerage title was created by Wanli Emperor. The first Prince of Gui was Zhu Changying, 7th son of Wanli Emperor. This peerage had 6 cadet commandery princely peerages, all of these second-rank peerages had not inherited. The last Southern Ming emperor, Zhu Youlang (Yongli Emperor) was a member of this peerage.

Generation name / poem
As members of this peerage were descentants of the Yongle Emperor, their generation poem was:-

This peerage used the poem until Ci (慈) generation.

Members

Zhu Changying (朱常瀛; 1597 -21 Dec 1645)(1st), Wanli Emperor's 7th son. He granted the title of in 1601 from his father and took his fief in 1627. After Zhang Xianzhong attacked his princedom, he brought his surviving family escaped to Guangxi. He later died and buried at Wuzhou. After his fourth son, Zhu Youlang enthroned as Southern Ming's emperor, he was posthumously honored as an emperor by his son under the temple name "Lizong" (禮宗) and posthumous name "Emperor Titian Changdao Zhuangyi Wenghong Xingwen Xuanwu Renzhi Chengxiao Duan" (體天昌道莊毅溫弘興文宣武仁智誠孝端皇帝). His original posthumous name was Prince Duan of Gui (桂端王)
Name unknown, Hereditary Prince , Zhu Changying's eldest son who died prematurely.
Name unknown, Zhu Changying's second son. He was designated as his father's heir after the death of his eldest brother. Zhu Youlang posthumously honoured him the posthumous title "Prince Wen of Gui" (桂閔王)
Zhu You'ai (朱由𣜬; d.1646) (2nd), Zhu Changying's third son. He initially held the title Prince of Anren Comm. (安仁郡王). He inherited the princedom from 1645 to 1646. He died at Guangxi. His full posthumous name is Prince Gong of Gui (桂恭王)
Name unknown (d.1662) (4th), he succeeded the princedom after Zhu Youlang's enthronement.
Zhu Youlang (3rd), Zhu Changying's fourth son. he initially held the title Prince of Yongming Comm. (永明郡王). He succeeded the princedom in 1646. After his enthronement, the princedom was inherited by Zhu You'ai's son.
Zhu Youzhan (朱由榐), Zhu Changying's fifth so. He held the title Prince of Yongxing Comm. (永兴郡王). He died in chaos.
Name unknown, Zhu Changying's sixth son, died in chaos. He was posthumously bestowed the title "Prince of Xintian Comm." (新田郡王) during Longwu Emperor's reign.
Name unknown, Zhu Changying's seventh son, died in chaos. He was posthumously bestowed the title "Prince of Jianghua Comm." (江华郡王) during Longwu Emperor's reign.
Name unknown, Zhu Changying'# eighth son, died prematurely. He was posthumously bestowed the title "Prince of Jiashan Comm." (嘉善郡王) during Longwu Emperor's reign.

Ming dynasty princely peerages
Imperial families of Ming dynasty